The Local is a multi-regional, European, English-language digital news publisher with local editions in Austria, Denmark, France, Germany, Italy, Norway, Spain, Sweden and Switzerland. Each site, while alike in appearance, has separate editorial teams, each focused on its respective market.

Coverage is purely domestic in each country, and focuses on news and information for an immigrant or expat audience. The parent company The Local Europe AB, headquartered in Stockholm, Sweden, also owns English-language discussion forums in Germany (Toytown Germany) and Switzerland (English Forum).

History 

The Local was founded in Stockholm in 2004 by Paul Rapacioli, formerly a director of reed.co.uk  and managing editor James Savage, formerly a radio journalist and PR consultant. Rapacioli was managing director from 2004-2018. 

The original Swedish edition began in early 2004 as a weekly email newsletter which Paul Rapacioli started sending to other students in his "Swedish for Immigrants" class. The first news site was launched in Sweden in August 2004. The German edition was launched in 2008 and Swiss edition in 2011. In 2013 the company opened offices in France, Spain and Italy. By January 2015 the company claimed to have over 4.5 million readers per month. James Savage succeeded Paul Rapacioli as managing director in 2018.

Shareholders include venture capital firm CSB Capital, the 6th AP Fund and Almi Invest.

In January 2010 The Local acquired the thelocal.com domain name from First Quench Retailing, a UK alcohol retailer which went into administration at the end of 2009.

The Local launched a Client Studio in 2014 to produce sponsored content (native advertising).

In late 2017, The Local launched a subscription model (marketed as membership), beginning with the Swedish edition. Throughout 2018, The Local's membership programme was rolled out to other editions including Germany, France, Italy, and Spain. By early 2022 The Local had over 50,000 members.

In 2021 the company had a turnover of 33.7 million SEK and a profit of 2.6 million SEK.

Awards 
The Local Swedish edition was nominated in 2009 as Swedish Digital Newspaper of the Year ('Årets Dagstidning Digitala Medier'), as part of media magazine Medievärlden'''s annual newspaper awards.

In 2018, The Local Swedish edition was named Digital Publisher of the Year Award in the Popular Press category by the Swedish Magazine Publishers Association (Sveriges Tidskrifter).The Local's Client Studio received the bronze award in the Best Use of Online Media category at the 2018 Native Advertising Awards in Berlin.The Local'''s CEO James Savage received the Swedish Magazine Publishers' Associations Grand Prize (Sveriges tidskrifters stora pris) in 2021.

References

External links
The Local – Europe's news in English
The Local – France's news in English
The Local – Germany's news in English
The Local – Italy's news in English
The Local – Norway's news in English
The Local – Sweden's news in English
The Local – Switzerland's news in English
The Local – Austria's news in English
The Local – Denmark's news in English
The Local – Spain's news in English
Toytown Germany
English Forum

Internet properties established in 2004
Swedish news websites
Norwegian news websites
German news websites
Swiss news websites
Danish news websites
French news websites
Austrian news websites
Spanish news websites